Toriano Adaryll "Tito" Jackson (born October 15, 1953) is an American musician. He is an original member of the Jackson 5 (later known as The Jacksons), who rose to fame in the late 1960s and 1970s with the Motown label, and later had continued success with the group on the Epic label in the late 1970s and 1980s. Tito began a solo career in 2003 performing as a blues musician.

Early life 
Toriano Adaryll Jackson was born at St. Mary's Mercy Hospital in Gary, Indiana. He is the third of nine children of the Jackson family, Michael, Marlon, Jackie, Jermaine, Randy Jackson, Rebbie, La Toya and Janet who lived in a two bedroom house in Gary. His father, Joseph, was a steel mill worker, and played R&B in a band, the Falcons with his brother Luther. His mother, Katherine, is a Jehovah's Witness , She played the piano and the clarinet. At ten years of age, Tito was caught playing his father's guitar after he broke a string. After fixing the string, Joe demanded that he play for him. Once he was finished, Joe bought him his own guitar, and convinced Tito, Jackie, and Jermaine to form a singing group. He was impressed with the vocals of Jackie and Jermaine.

By 1964, Marlon and Michael both joined the group the Jackson 5, after Katherine discovered that they could sing. Katherine is a country-and-western fan, and she sang harmonies with her sons. Before Motown signed them, the brothers spent years rehearsing at home. After school they rehearsed for hours, played a gig, did homework and got to bed.

Career

The Jackson 5

After first performing in school functions and supermarkets, the brothers began participating in local talent shows when Jackson was twelve. By then, his younger brother Michael, then seven, had become the official lead singer of the group. In 1965, they changed their name from the Jackson Brothers to the Jackson Five, and won several talent shows around the Gary area. After winning the Amateur Night competition for The Apollo Theater in August 1967, Joe Jackson began to work part-time at the steel mill to help his sons secure a recording contract. The group signed with Steeltown Records in Gary in November of that year. In January 1968, the Jackson Five's first single, "Big Boy", was released on the Steeltown label.

In 1969, the Jackson 5 signed with Motown Records in Detroit, and scored several hit songs, including the number-one singles "I Want You Back", "ABC", "The Love You Save", and "I'll Be There", but despite his talent as a guitar player, Motown refused to allow Jackson to perform guitar on any of the Jackson 5 recording sessions, instead forcing all their guitar parts to be performed by session musicians. As a direct result, his guitar work did not make its debut until he and the Jacksons left Motown for CBS Records in 1976. He began writing songs with his brothers during this time. Tito and Jackie Jackson were the most consistently present members of the Jacksons, with Jermaine, Marlon, Michael, and Randy leaving at different times. After the end of the Victory Tour, Jackson performed session work and as a record producer. After releasing 2300 Jackson Street, the Jacksons ceased recording work. Jackson was inducted with his brothers into the Rock and Roll Hall of Fame in 1997.

In 2001, Jackson reunited with his brothers on Michael Jackson's 30th anniversary concert special at Madison Square Garden.

Solo work and other projects 

Jackson began a solo career in 2003 performing as a blues musician in various clubs with his band, which included producer and guitarist Angelo Earl, and a management team that included Ed Tate. In 2007, in the United Kingdom, Jackson appeared as a judge on the BBC celebrity singing competition Just the Two of Us for series two of the show. He replaced singer Lulu, who was a judge on series one. His co-judges were vocal coach CeCe Sammy, musician Stewart Copeland, and radio DJ Trevor Nelson. In 2009, he was the executive producer of The Jacksons: A Family Dynasty, together with his brothers after Michael died.

In 2016, he had his first commercially successful solo single on the Billboard charts with the single, "Get It Baby", featuring Big Daddy Kane from his album Tito Time  becoming the ninth and final Jackson family sibling to place a solo single on the charts. The album was released in Japan late in 2016, and in the U.S on iTunes in April 2017. Since its launch, three singles have been released to radio in the US. The first single, "When the Magic Happens", featuring Jocelyn Brown, was released on April 1, 2017. Jackson launched the album for the UK market in September 2017.

Jackson performed at  the 2019 Living Legends foundation's (LLF) Annual Awards Dinner and Gala, performing his single "One Way Street" off his album Tito Time. "One Way Street" features a remix from producer Gregg Pagani, who has worked with Charlie Wilson and Johnny Gill.

On July 9, 2021, he released the first single "Love One Another" from his second solo album "Under Your Spell", released August 6. The single features his brother Marlon Jackson, Kenny Neal, Bobby Rush (musician) and Stevie Wonder. On this album he turned to blues compared to his debut album, Tito Time, which explored more pop and R&B sounds. The album "Under your spell" also features collaborations with George Benson, rock guitarist Joe Bonamassa, Grady Champion, Claudette King, The O'Jay's Eddie Levert and Steven Powell.

On September 16, 2022, Jackson took the stage at Ground Zero Blues Club in Biloxi, Mississippi together with Kenny Neal. This was their second show from their "Straight From The Heart Tour". First show was on August 27 at Winston-Salem Fairgrounds Annex in Winston-Salem, North Carolina.Third show was on September 23, in Bogalusa, Louisiana at the Bogalusa Blues and Heritage Festival.

On March 17, 2023, Jackson teamed up with brazilian artist Natalia Damini bringing the Motown and the early Jacksons feel back with a new song "Attitude", and a music video. This collaboration came to be because Jackson's long time friend Charve the Don is also Damini's manager.

Personal life

Family
Jackson married Delores "Dee Dee" Martes in June 1972 at the age of 18, and the couple divorced in 1988. In 1994, Martes was found deceased floating in a swimming pool. The death was originally ruled accidental. Later, a Los Angeles businessman, Donald Bohana, was subsequently charged with murdering her and later found guilty of second-degree murder in 1998.

The couple had three sons, who comprise the musical group 3T:

 Tariano Adaryll Jackson II ("Taj") (born August 4, 1973).
 Taryll Adren Jackson (born August 8, 1975).
 Tito Joe Jackson ("TJ") (born July 16, 1978).

Jackson has eight grandchildren.

Michael's memorial
Michael Jackson's memorial service was held at the Staples Center on Tuesday, July 7, 2009, in Los Angeles. To honor him, Tito and his brothers Marlon, Jackie, Jermaine and Randy Jackson served as pallbearers wearing a single spangly white glove and sunglasses.

On the 12th anniversary of Michael's passing, Jackson turned to Michael's music in remembrance he told Manchester Evening News in a 2021 interview. In the interview, Jackson says that because of his brother’s passing, the month of June is difficult to deal with. He also defends his brother from allegations levied against him.

Discography

Studio albums

Singles

References 

1953 births
Living people
20th-century American guitarists
20th-century American singers
21st-century American singers
African-American guitarists
African-American male guitarists
African-American male singers
American baritones
American blues guitarists
American blues singers
American funk guitarists
American funk singers
American male guitarists
American male pop singers
American male singers
American people who self-identify as being of Native American descent
American rhythm and blues guitarists
American rhythm and blues singers
American soul guitarists
American soul singers
Child pop musicians
Epic Records artists
Guitarists from Indiana
Guitarists from Los Angeles
Tito Jackson
Motown artists
Musicians from Gary, Indiana
Rhythm guitarists
Singers from Indiana
Singers from Los Angeles
The Jackson 5 members